DuBridge Range is a mountain range, over 20 nautical miles (37 km) long in the Admiralty Mountains. The range trends southwest–northeast between Pitkevitch Glacier and Shipley Glacier and terminates at the north coast of Victoria Land just west of Flat Island, Antarctica. This mountain range was first mapped by the United States Geological Survey from surveys and U.S Navy air photos, 1960–63, and was named by the Advisory Committee on Antarctic Names for Lee DuBridge, a member of the National Science Board for several years, and Science Advisor to the President of the United States, 1969–70. The mountain range lies situated on the Pennell Coast, a portion of Antarctica lying between Cape Williams and Cape Adare.

References 

Mountain ranges of Victoria Land
Pennell Coast